Bajep Sårjåsjávrre is a lake that lies on the northern edge of the Sulitjelma massif near the border between Norway and Sweden. It lies immediately west of larger Vuolep Sårjåsjávrre (Lower Lake Sårjås), which straddles the border between the two countries. The  lake lies just to the east of the large Blåmann Glacier.

See also
List of lakes in Norway

References

Lakes of Nordland
Fauske